The Treasure of Bird Island is a 1953 Czechoslovak animated film directed by Karel Zeman in his feature length debut.

The film, based on a Persian fairy tale, was Zeman's first feature-length work. 
The soundtrack includes verses by František Hrubín, read by children, as well as an original film score by Zdeněk Liška.

The film's style is an experiment in combining two- and three-dimensional animation, including hand-drawn backgrounds and figures animated in relief. The production design is based on the traditional manuscript-illustration style of Persian miniatures.

References

External links

1953 animated films
1953 films
Films directed by Karel Zeman
Czechoslovak animated films
Czech animated films
Treasure hunt films
Films with screenplays by Karel Zeman
1950s Czech-language films
1950s Czech films